Kyle Jay Weatherman (born August 28, 1997) is an American professional stock car racing driver. He competes part-time in the NASCAR Xfinity Series, driving the No. 02 Chevrolet Camaro for Our Motorsports. He has previously competed in the NASCAR Cup Series, NASCAR Camping World Truck Series and ARCA Racing Series in the past.

Racing career

Early years
Weatherman was born in Wentzville, Missouri, where he was first introduced to racing by his father and a family friend at the age of eight years old, with Kyle and brother Clayton both racing go-karts.  Later on, Weatherman moved up to bandolero racing. He spent four years racing Bandoleros, culminating in a national championship.

At age 12, Weatherman moved to the Legends Series, in which he raced until age 15. At the same time, he participated in some IMCA dirt races. He won the Legends National Championship at Las Vegas Motor Speedway and became the youngest driver up until that point to claim victory in that race.

ARCA Racing Series
When Weatherman was 15, he made the move to the ARCA Racing Series. Running in five races that year, he recorded four top fives and a best finish of second with his family-owned team. The following year, he also became a development driver for Roush Fenway Racing. He made eight starts for the Roush-affiliated Roulo Brothers Racing, finding moderate success. 2015 was a highly successful season as he was named Rookie of the Year, won the Short-Track Championship and contributed to winning the Bill France Four Crown Award, riding with Cunningham Motorsports. Weatherman won all those accolades despite not running a full schedule; in fifteen races he won his first career race at New Jersey Motorsports Park, won three straight poles and led laps in ten races while posting just two finishes outside the top ten. Signing on with Lira Motorsports to start 2015, Weatherman ran eight races with the team before running the next two with Mason Mitchell Motorsports. In his first race, at Madison International Speedway,  Weatherman led over half of the 200 laps and came home second to Josh Williams. Running a few races for his own team near the end of the season, Weatherman captured the pole at Pocono and was briefly hospitalized after a hard crash with Myatt Snider in the season's final race. He ended up competing in 15 of 20 events to finish seventh in points; he had seven Top 5 and nine top-ten finishes. Prior to the 2017 season, Mason Mitchell Motorsports announced that Weatherman would run ten races for the team. Weatherman once again led the most laps early in the season at the Nashville Fairgrounds Speedway.

NASCAR

Weatherman teamed up with Roush Fenway Racing development team Lira Motorsports to run the 2015 NASCAR Camping World Truck Series season finale at Homestead-Miami Speedway.  In the debut race for driver and team, Weatherman qualified 21st but was hampered by a pit road penalty in the early stages of the event, resulting in a 23rd-place finish, three laps down.

On October 23, 2017, it was announced that Weatherman would make his Monster Energy NASCAR Cup Series debut driving Rick Ware Racing's No. 51 at Martinsville Speedway. He would also drive the car at Phoenix International Raceway. A year later, Weatherman joined StarCom Racing to run the 2018 Overton's 400 at Chicagoland Speedway, driving the No. 99 car. Although that was his first race appearance for the team, Weatherman had been a StarCom employee since April. Weatherman wound up making six additional starts in the No. 99, recording a best finish of 26th at Las Vegas Motor Speedway.

In 2019, Weatherman debuted in the NASCAR Xfinity Series for Rick Ware Racing, and also made a Cup start for the team at Michigan International Speedway in June. Later that month at Sonoma Raceway, he qualified Premium Motorsports' No. 15 car in place of Ross Chastain, who was competing in the Truck race at Gateway.

Weatherman returned to Mike Harmon Racing and the Xfinity Series in 2020. At Kentucky Speedway's Shady Rays 200 in July, Weatherman scored MHR's best finish and maiden top ten when he finished eighth.

He was promoted to a full-time ride in MHR's No. 47 for the 2021 Xfinity season. Weatherman departed the team at the end of the year.

On January 31, 2022, Weatherman announced he would drive the first five races of the NASCAR Xfinity Series season with DGM Racing driving the 92 and having sponsorship from LS Tractor at Daytona International Speedway and Atlanta Motor Speedway. California Law Enforcement would sponsor Weatherman at Auto Club Speedway, Las Vegas Motor Speedway and Phoenix Raceway. He finished 8th at Atlanta. He also drove for the No. 34 Jesse Iwuji Motorsports Chevrolet for a majority of the season, including another 8th place finish at Loudon.

Personal life
Weatherman, the oldest child of Daryn and Lori Weatherman, was born and raised in Wentzville, Missouri, where he lived until he was 17. He then moved to Concord, North Carolina, and lived with fellow driver Chris Buescher. Weatherman views Buescher, the 2015 NASCAR Xfinity Series champion, as a mentor and a major influence on his career.

Weatherman has two younger siblings, one of whom is ARCA driver Clayton Weatherman.

Motorsports career results

NASCAR
(key) (Bold – Pole position awarded by qualifying time. Italics – Pole position earned by points standings or practice time. * – Most laps led.)

Monster Energy Cup Series

Xfinity Series

Camping World Truck Series

 Season still in progress
 Ineligible for series points

ARCA Racing Series
(key) (Bold – Pole position awarded by qualifying time. Italics – Pole position earned by points standings or practice time. * – Most laps led.)

References

External links
 
 

1997 births
Living people
Racing drivers from Missouri
ARCA Menards Series drivers
People from Wentzville, Missouri
NASCAR drivers